Íþróttafélagið Stál-úlfur is a multi-sports club in Kópavogur, Iceland. They are currently field men's teams in basketball, volleyball and football. The club was founded in 2010 by Lithuanian immigrants in Iceland.

Basketball

Notable players

Volleyball
In the 2022-2023 season, Stál-úlfur fielded a team in the top-tier Úrvalsdeild karla.

References

External links
 Basketball team profile at kki.is
 Football team profile at ksi.is

Basketball teams in Iceland
Football clubs in Iceland
Multi-sport clubs in Iceland